Milan Tošnar (February 27, 1925 - June 15, 2016) was a Czech athlete (hurdler), coach and sports official. He was the first Czechoslovak runner for 110 metres Hurdles, which exceeded 15 seconds. Multiple representative of Czechoslovakia. Medalist from international university competitions.

Education 
Tošnar is a graduate of the Faculty of Education of Masaryk University in Brno in 1950 and in 1961 he successfully defended a candidate doctoral thesis at the Charles University in Prague.

International competitions

Biography 
In 1947, for the first time, he overcomes the Czechoslovak record in the course of the 110 m hurdles. He created a total of 11 Czechoslovak records, especially in the popular " through high fences" (best time 14.6, August 9, 1951, Berlin), 10x was the champion of the republic (six times 110 metres hurdles 1946-50 and 1954, twice 400 metres hurdles 1948-49, 4x100 m relay 1946 and 4x400 m relay 1951), and 24x represented Czechoslovakia (1946-1955). He was twice a participant in the European Championships (Oslo 1946 European Athletics Championships – Men's 110 metres hurdles, Brusells 1950 European Athletics Championships – Men's 110 metres hurdles) and achieved great achievements: Paris 1947 International University Games CIE (pre-Universiade), World Student Games (UIE) Budapest Athletics at the 1949 World Festival of Youth and Students, World Student Games (UIE) Berlin Athletics at the 1951 World Festival of Youth and Students

After finishing the active racing at the end of the 1950s, he became a trainer of the sprinters and hurdlers of Dukla Praha. He also works in the athletic association ČSTV (1959-1962) as chairman of the methodological committee. In 1960 he is the attendant of the Olympic Games in Rome like a coach. Since athletics in the mid-1960s he has moved to football. She becomes assistant to a trainer at football team Dukla Praha, responsible for athletic training. He won one of the last titles of the Czechoslovak Republic champion (1965/66), two Czechoslovak Cups (1966, 1969) and also walked with him to the semifinals of European Champion Clubs' Cup 1966–67 European Cup. In 1970-1983, he worked in management of Czechoslovak army sport (ends as a colonel).

References

External links 
 Encyclopedia of the City of Brno (czech)
 Moravska Slavia Glory Gallery (czech)
 Memories and texts, Jak jsme atletívali - Milan Tošnar (czech)
 History of Czech Hurdlers (czech)
 Army sports club of athletics in Dukla Prague (czech)
 Grand Prix of the City of Prostějov (czech)
 Czech athletic federation informs - The personality of the hurdles is ninety (czech)
 Czech athletic federation informs - Milan Tošnar died (czech)

1925 births
2016 deaths
Sportspeople from Brno
Czechoslovak male hurdlers
Czechoslovak
Athletics (track and field) coaches
Czech sports coaches
Charles University alumni